Who Killed Jane Doe? (formerly known as The Jane Doe Diaries) is an American true-crime documentary series featuring cases of formerly unidentified women and the investigation process of finding their killers. The episodes also detail the circumstances of each subject's disappearance and life before she lost contact with family members, and lead up to the connection or match between the missing individual and the unidentified remains. The program was cancelled in 2018.

Episodes

Each season consisted of six episodes, each documenting one Jane Doe case.

Season one

Season two

See also

Forensic Files
Cold Case Files
Unidentified decedent

References

2017 American television series debuts
2018 American television series endings
English-language television shows
Investigation Discovery original programming
True crime television series
2010s American documentary television series
Unidentified decedents
Violence against women in the United States